The Uruguayan Women's Suffrage Alliance (Alianza Uruguaya por el Sufragio Femenino, or simply Alianza) was a Uruguayan women's suffrage organization. The Alianza was cofounded by Paulina Luisi in August 1919, breaking away from CONAMU to concentrate on pressing for women's suffrage. It was an affiliate of the International Women's Suffrage Alliance (IWSA). 

In 1929 the Alianza restated its programme, placing female legal equality as its number one goal, and relegating female suffrage to fifth place in its list of priorities.

References

1919 establishments in Uruguay
Feminism and history
Feminist organizations in South America
Organizations established in 1919
Social history of Uruguay
Voter rights and suffrage organizations
Women's organizations based in Uruguay
Women's suffrage in Uruguay
Feminism in Uruguay